Pseudohemiculter kweichowensis is a species of freshwater ray-finned fish from the family Cyprinidae, the carps and minnows from south east Asia. It is endemic to Guiyang, China.

References

Cyprinid fish of Asia
Pseudohemiculter
Fish described in 1942